A sucker rod is a steel rod, typically between 25 and 30 feet (7 to 9 meters) in length, and threaded at both ends, used in the oil industry to join together the surface and downhole components of a reciprocating piston pump installed in an oil well. The pumpjack is the visible above-ground drive for the well pump, and is connected to the downhole pump at the bottom of the well by a series of interconnected sucker rods. Sucker rods are also commonly available made of fiberglass in 37 1/2 foot lengths and diameters of 3/4, 7/8, 1, and 1 1/4 inch. These are terminated in metallic threaded ends, female at one end and male at the other.

The surface unit transfers energy for pumping the well from the prime-mover to the sucker rod string. In doing this, it must change the rotary motion of the prime-mover to reciprocating motion for the sucker rod. And it must reduce the speed of the prime-mover to a suitable pumping speed. Speed reduction is accomplished by using a gear reducer, and rotary motion of the crank shaft is converted to oscillatory motion by means of a walking beam. The crank arm is connected to the walking beam by means of a pitman arm. The walking beam is supported by a Samson post and saddle bearing. The horse head and bridle are used to ensure that the pull on the sucker rod string is vertical all times so that no bearing movement is applied to that part of sucker rod string above stuffing box. The polished rod and stuffing box combination is used to maintain a good liquid seal at the surface.

Technical parameters

Mechanical Properties for OCTG Sucker Rod

Mechanical Properties for Sinker Bar

Productive process of sucker rod
1. Inspection of steel round bar
2. Straightening -Cold
3. Length cutting
4. Forging
5. Heat treatment
6. Straightening - heat
7. Shot blasting
8. Upset Machining
9. Assembly, Protect cap
10. Packing, Varnishing

See also

Oilfield terminology

References
Schlumberger Oilfield Glossary: Sucker rod
Welding Sucker Rod That Meets API Standard is Supplied

Oilfield terminology